The 2021 Canoe Slalom World Cup was a series of four races in several canoeing and kayaking categories organized by the International Canoe Federation (ICF). It was the 34th edition.

Calendar 

The series opened with World Cup Race 1 in Prague, Czech Republic (11–13 June) and closed with the World Cup Final in Pau, France (10–12 September).

Standings 
The winner of each race was awarded 60 points (with double points awarded for the World Cup Final). Points for lower places differed from one category to another. Every participant was guaranteed at least 2 points for participation and 5 points for qualifying for the semifinal run.

Points 
World Cup points were awarded based on the results of each race at each event as follows:

Results

World Cup Race 1 

11–13 June in Prague, Czech Republic.

World Cup Race 2 

18–20 June in Markkleeberg, Germany.

World Cup Race 3 

3-5 September in La Seu, Spain.

World Cup Final 

10-12 September in Pau, France.

References

External links 
 International Canoe Federation

Canoe Slalom World Cup
Canoe Slalom World Cup